The 2017–18 season was Forest Green Rovers's 129th year in existence and their first in League Two following promotion via the play-offs last season. Along with competing in League Two, the club also participated in the FA Cup, EFL Cup and the EFL Trophy.

The season covers the period from 1 July 2017 to 30 June 2018.

Transfers

Transfers in

Transfers out

Loans in

Loans out

Competitions

Friendlies
As of 22 June 2017, Forest Green Rovers have announced nine pre-season friendlies against Bristol Rovers, Kidderminster Harriers, Bishop's Cleeve, Weston-super-Mare, Shortwood United, Brimscombe & Thrupp, Swindon Supermarine, Worthing and Farense during a training camp in Portugal.

League Two

League table

Result summary

Results by matchday

Matches
On 21 June 2017, the league fixtures were announced.

FA Cup
On 16 October 2017, Forest Green Rovers were drawn at home to Macclesfield Town in the first round. Another home tie was confirmed for the second round, against Exeter City.

EFL Cup
On 16 June 2017, Forest Green Rovers were drawn at home to MK Dons in the first round.

EFL Trophy
On 12 July 2017, Forest Green Rovers were drawn in Southern Group E against Cheltenham Town, Newport County and Swansea City U23s. After finished as runners-up in the group stages, FGR were drawn away to Swindon Town in the second round. A third round trip to Yeovil Town was next on the cards after seeing off Swindon Town in the previous round.

Statistics

Appearances and goals

|-
! colspan=14 style=background:#dcdcdc; text-align:center| Goalkeepers

|-
! colspan=14 style=background:#dcdcdc; text-align:center| Defenders

|-
! colspan=14 style=background:#dcdcdc; text-align:center| Midfielders

|-
! colspan=14 style=background:#dcdcdc; text-align:center| Forwards

|-
! colspan=14 style=background:#dcdcdc; text-align:center| Players transferred out during the season

References

Forest Green Rovers F.C. seasons
Forest Green Rovers